Biker Mice from Mars is an American animated series, a revival of the show with the same name which aired from 1993 to 1996. One season of 28 episodes were produced. It is a continuation of the 1993–1996 series.

Jim Ward won a 2009 voice-actor Daytime Emmy for his performance as Eyemore in the episode "Manchurian Charley" and as the Crusher in the episode "Here Come The Judge". The series aired on the 4Kids TV block on FOX in the fall of 2008. In the UK, the series was picked up for a second window by CSC Media Group, who scheduled it to air on April 2, 2010 on the Kix channel.

Plot
Taking place a few years after the events of the original series, the Biker Mice return to Earth. In this series, the lead antagonists are the evil Catatonians, a race of cat-like creatures who desire the greatest prize on Mars and the Regenerator while also having been rivals of the Plutarkians. In the process of obtaining it, they destroy it leaving the Biker Mice (including Stoker – see below) to flee to Earth to build a new one.

Characters

Returning characters
 The Biker Mice (voiced by Dorian Harewood as Modo, Rob Paulsen as Throttle, Ian Ziering as Vinnie) - The Mice themselves are, character-wise, almost the same as before, except that now they have been properly formed into a special commando squad; as such, Throttle's leadership role has been formally recognized with the rank of Commander. There have also been minor changes in costume: Throttle has new sunglasses and a solitary green shoulder belt under a new, shorter vest and his one powered glove has been replaced with twin powered gloves that also act as laser blasters, Modo has new boots and a cutting torch in his mechanical arm, Vinnie carries powered shuriken and powered gloves identical to Throttle's, and all three have new helmets. But more controversially for fans of the original series, they have been drawn substantially slimmed-down and less muscular, noticeably less furry and more anthropomorphic than originally. All three also have new bikes: Vinnie has a red superbike similar to his old one, Modo has a purple-blue three-wheeled chopper he calls "Hard Case", and Throttle has a green cruiser or bobber in place of his old black chopper or Softail. All three bikes are augmented with new weapons, improved artificial intelligence, and flight, aquatic, and all-terrain capabilities.
 Charlene "Charley" Davidson (voiced by Lisa Zane) - Essentially Charley is the same character-wise, but with a new, short haircut and a more contemporary outfit suited to motorcycling rather than mechanics. Although not present in every episode, she appears in the majority and plays a more prominent role than in the original series. Her relationship with Vinnie has been toned down for the new series, but (in true absence-makes-the-heart-grow-fonder fashion) Charley appears to reciprocate Vinnie's feelings towards her more readily than in the original series. She was previously voiced by Leeza Miller McGee in the 1990s series.
 Carbine (voiced by Dina Sherman) - Carbine, revealed to be Stoker's niece, has gained a slight costume change and plays a substantially more prominent role than originally, even appearing on Earth several times. Her (strained) relationship with Throttle still exists, emphasizing the strain of the War and their relative military responsibilities. She was previously voiced by Leah Remini in the 1990s series.
 Stoker (voiced by Peter Strauss in 2006–2007, Jim Ward from 2007–present) - Stoker is the classic series minor character who has had the most significant increase in importance, acting as the catalyst for much of the 2006 series' plot. The founder (and leader) of the Freedom Fighter movement, in the new series he has been missing in action for several years and is wrongly (but widely, except by Vinnie) held to have turned traitor. He is the inventor of the Regenerator, a matter-conversion device crucial to produce the water needed for the survival of the Martian population. Some years earlier, he had been forced to build a second Regenerator for Ronaldo Rump. When the Martian Regenerator was accidentally destroyed by the Catatonians the Biker Mice were dispatched to Earth to recover Rump's machine, the plot of the new series. His alter-ego is Nightshift, a black-clad masked biker. The disguise was originally adopted when he was still regarded as a traitor, but is now used to protect him from sunlight, which (because of overexposure to radioactive tetra-hydrocarbons, the power source of the Regenerator) causes him to temporarily mutate into a wererat. In the final episodes, he is revealed to have a young teenage daughter named Spitfire, who aids the Mice and helps return him to normal by using the Regenerator on him when applied with the fur sample of a Catatonian shapeshifter.
 Rimfire (voiced by Jess Harnell) - Modo's nephew, briefly selected as Throttle's replacement when Throttle is promoted to one-star general and to be reassigned to Mars. Carbine decided to rescind Throttle's promotion after seeing that Rimfire still wasn't up to spec as a "Biker Mice," even after a year's training for such a placement. He was previously voiced by Brian Austin Green in the 1990s series.
 Lawrence Lactavious Limburger (voiced by W. Morgan Sheppard) - A Plutarkian who returns for revenge on the Biker Mice after years of being a (literal) bootlicker for the Pit Boss. He later worked on his latest evil plot to get even with the Biker Mice. The Catatonians later used the Regenerator on him that turned him into a fish.
 Dr. Karbunkle (voiced by Susan Silo) - A human-shaped alien mad scientist that worked for Limburger and has also spent years of being a bootlicker for the Pit Boss. Also returning for revenge on the Biker Mice with Limburger and even had to collaborate with Dr. Phineas P. Catorkian. Around the end of the series, the Regenerator turns Karbunkle into a turtle.
 Greasepit (voiced by Jess Harnell) - A grease-covered criminal that was one of Limburger's minions and had briefly become a henchman of Ronaldo Rump in the Catatonians' plot to disguise the aliens that Limburger gathered as the different world leaders. He was previously voiced by Brad Garrett in the 1990s series.
 Pit Boss (voiced by Jess Harnell) - The ruler of the Pits beneath the Rump Mini-Mart. Lawrence Limburger and Dr. Karbunkle became bootlickers for the Pit Boss since the Biker Mice defeated them. He was previously voiced by Stu Rosen in the 1990s series.
 Napoleon Brie (voiced by Luke Perry) - A Plutarkian and rival of Lawrence Limburger who returned in "Once Upon a Time on Earth" Pt. 2 in a plot to use the Regenerator to conquer Chicago. He even tried to turn Limburger over to Lord Camembert only to discover that he and the Plutarkians with him were Catatonian shapeshifters in disguise. The Catatonians later used the Regenerator on Napoleon that turned him into a fish.
 Lord Camembert (voiced by Jess Harnell) - The ruler of the Plutarkians who was impersonated by a Catatonian shapeshifter. He was previously voiced by Jeff Bennett in the 1990s series.
 Harley (voiced by Jennifer Hale) - Harley is Vinnie's former sweetheart. Before the Biker Mice went to Earth, Harley was kidnapped by a rat named Mace, got half her face blown off, and then was shown mercy by other rats. Therefore, she turned on her own people and aided the rats in their fight. Since then, she has come to hate the Biker Mice because she feels that they gave up on her, although this was not the case as Vinnie in particular had searched extensively. However, near-cataclysmic eruptions that threaten to doom Mars snap Harley back to reality, driving her to sacrifice herself to save Mars. She was previously voiced by Kath Soucie in the 1990s series.

New characters
 Spitfire (voiced by Dina Sherman) - The daughter of Stoker.
 Catatonians - The Catatonians are a race of cat-like aliens that seek to claim the Regenerator. The three-part episode "Once Upon a Time on Earth" revealed that they were rivals of the Plutarkians.
 Hannibal T. Hairball (voiced by Rob Paulsen in a Russian accent) - The Assistant Supreme Commander of the Catatonian Army who is very short and incompetent. Hairball escapes the Regenerator purge of the Catatonians, and alongside Dr. Catorkian joins up with the Nomad Rats.
 Cataclysm (voiced by Clancy Brown in most episodes, understudied by Dorian Harewood in "Biker Mice Down Under" and "Once Upon a Time on Earth" Pt. 1) - While officially the second-in-command to his younger brother Hannibal, it is Cataclysm who really calls the shots in the Catatonian quest for the Regenerator. At the end of “Once Upon a Time on Mars”, the Regenerator is used to transform him into a harmless, non-anthropomorphic mouse.
 Dr. Phineas P. Catorkian (voiced by Jess Harnell impersonating Boris Karloff) - A very tall and thin Catatonian mad scientist who is the force behind most of the inventions that Hannibal and Cataclysm use against the Biker Mice. Catorkian escapes the Regenerator purge of the Catatonians at the end of the series and alongside Hairball joins up with the Nomad Rats.
 Catalina Catacall (voiced by Martha Madison) - A female Catatonian shapeshifter.
 Ronaldo Rump (voiced by Jess Harnell) - A parody of Donald Trump and Ricky Ricardo, with an oversized butt, a large Toupée and a pencil mustache. Ronaldo used to be a used car salesman who came across Stoker and the Regenerators in his possession. He uses a Regenerator to make himself more wealthy, but it is running out of power and he is trying to force Stoker to build a new one. At the time when he built his tower over where Limburger Plaza used to be, Ronaldo was approached by Hannibal and his Catatonian army where Ronaldo formed an alliance with him.

Episodes

Production and broadcast
Pre-production was started in May 2005 with United Kingdom broadcaster GMTV signed on.

Biker Mice from Mars aired in the United Kingdom and Ireland, and Finland, in 2006. It aired in the United States on Fox 4Kids TV block, beginning on August 9, 2008. Italia 1 began broadcasting the show in late 2008 with Mediaset doing a large merchandising campaign to support the show.

Broadcast UK history 
CITV (August 26, 2006 – July 26, 2007)

Home media
As of 2011, four volumes of Biker Mice from Mars DVDs are available in the UK through Abbey Home Media. Two volumes were released in Australia and New Zealand by Madman Entertainment. Volume one was released in Bulgaria on October 17, 2008. Eight volumes have been released, but some have repeated episodes.

Merchandise
Giochi Preziosi (GP) was selected as worldwide toy licensee. GP retained Pangea as developers of the toy line.  Home entertainment, merchandise, publishing and promotions agency for the series was Sharpe Company.

In 2006, a Biker Mice From Mars video game, based on the 2006 revival, was released in Finland, Australia and the United Kingdom, for the Nintendo DS and Sony PS2 consoles. While the game itself did not receive major positive ratings, it sold successfully throughout Scandinavia, where game performed well, placing number 2 in Finland and in the top 10 in other Scandinavian, Northern European, and African territories.

References

External links
 
 
 Biker Mice From Mars YouTube TV Shows

2000s American animated television series
2006 American television series debuts
2007 American television series endings
American children's animated action television series
American children's animated adventure television series
American children's animated science fiction television series
American children's animated superhero television series
Biker Mice from Mars
Mars in television
Motorcycle television series
Television shows set in Chicago
Animated television series about mice and rats
Animated television series reboots
Television series by 20th Century Fox Television
Television series created by Rick Ungar